Central Election Committee may refer to:

Central Election Committee of the Bharatiya Janata Party
Central Election Committee of the Indian National Congress
Central Elections Committee, a government agency in Israel